The 13th Racquetball World Championships were held in Santo Domingo (Dominican Republic) from August 3 to 13, with 22 men's national teams and 18 women's national teams in the national teams competition; and several players in the Singles and Doubles competition. 


Men's team competition

Men's final standings

Women's team competition

Women's final standings

See also
Racquetball World Championships

External links
Men's Team Results 
Women's Team Results 
Historical final standings IRF website

Racquetball World Championships
Racquetball World Championships
Racquetball World Championships
Racquetball in the Dominican Republic
International sports competitions hosted by the Dominican Republic